is a Japanese football player as Midfielder. He currently play for Nagoya Grampus.

Career 
Riku Yamada joined J1 League club Omiya Ardija in 2017. On May 31, he debuted in J.League Cup (v Júbilo Iwata).

After loan at Grulla Morioka, AC Nagano Parceiro and Ventforet Kofu for three years respectively. On 29 November 2020, Riku Yamada officially permanent transfer to Ventforet Kofu for 2021 season. On 16 October 2022, he brought his club winner 2022 Emperor's Cup for the first time in history after defeat Sanfrecce Hiroshima penalty 5-4. He left from the club in 2022 after three years at Kofu.

On 30 November 2022, Riku Yamada announcement officially transfer to Nagoya Grampus for upcoming 2023 season.

Career statistics

Club 
Updated to the start from 2023 season.

Honours

Club 
Ventforet Kofu
 Emperor's Cup: 2022

References

External links 

Profile at Omiya Ardija
Profile at Grulla Morioka

1998 births
Living people
Association football people from Tokyo
Japanese footballers
J1 League players
J2 League players
J3 League players
Omiya Ardija players
Iwate Grulla Morioka players
AC Nagano Parceiro players
Ventforet Kofu players
Nagoya Grampus players
Association football midfielders